James, Jim, or Jimmy Love may refer to:

Politics
 James Love (Kentucky politician) (1795–1874), U.S. Representative from Kentucky
 Jimmy L. Love Sr., American politician, member of the North Carolina General Assembly

Sport
 Jimmy Love (footballer) (1858–1882), Scottish footballer
 Jim Love (rugby league), Australian rugby league footballer who played in the 1910s and 1920s
 Jimmy Love (Australian soccer) (fl. 1921–1923), Australian soccer player
 Jim Love (rugby union) (born 1953), New Zealand rugby union footballer and coach
 Jim Love (cricketer) (born 1955), English cricketer
 James Love (rugby union, born 1987), English rugby union footballer

Others
 James Love (poet) (1721–1774), British actor, playwright and poet
 Sir James Frederick Love (1789–1866), British general
 James M. Love (1820–1891), United States federal judge
 James Robinson Love (1836–1914), Australian merchant and founder of J. R. Love & Co Ltd and Kinkara Tea
 James Robert Beattie Love (1889–1947), Presbyterian clergyman and authority on the Worrorra people of Western Australia
 Jim Love (artist) (1927–2005), American modernist sculptor
 James Love (NGO director) (born 1950), American NGO director in field of intellectual property
 James Love (musician), Canadian guitarist

See also
Jamie Love (disambiguation)